EulerOS is a commercial Linux distribution developed by Huawei for enterprise applications. It was first released on September 24, 2021.

Huawei has released a community edition of EulerOS, OpenEuler, along with the source code on Gitee.

KunLun Mission Critical Server
EulerOS 2.0, running on the Huawei KunLun Mission Critical Server, was certified to conform to The Open Group's UNIX 03 standard, however the certification expired in September 2022. 

EulerOS/KunLun allows replacing central processing unit board modules and memory modules without stopping the OS. Hot swapping of CPU and memory is provided by EulerOS.

Code shared with HarmonyOS 
EulerOS shares kernel technology with Huawei's mobile operating system, HarmonyOS. Huawei plans to unify additional components between both OSes.

References

External links
 EulerOS
 OpenEuler
 OpenEuler Gitee Repository 
 EulerOS at Docker Hub

Huawei products
Enterprise Linux distributions
RPM-based Linux distributions
Unix variants
X86-64 Linux distributions
Linux distributions